The Broken Chain is a 1993 TV movie made by the TNT network. It tells the true story of Iroquois warrior Thayendanegea participating in the French and Indian War and the American Revolutionary War.

Cast
Pierce Brosnan: William Johnson
Eric Schweig: Thayendanegea, also known as Joseph Brant
Wes Studi: Seth/Chief/Speaker for the Tribes
Buffy Sainte-Marie: Gesina 'Grandmother'/Seth's wife
Graham Greene: Peace Maker (Spirit)
Elaine Bilstad: Catherine

External links
 

1993 television films
1993 films
American Revolutionary War films
Films about Native Americans
French and Indian War films
TNT Network original films
Films scored by Charles Fox